ArtEZ University of Arts is an art academy in Netherlands. ArtEZ  combines several art institutes and art disciplines with branches in Arnhem, Enschede, and Zwolle. In its name the A stands for Arnhem, the E for Enschede, and Z for Zwolle.

Academics
ArtEZ has divisions in the following subjects in the following locations:
 Arnhem: fashion design, graphic design, product design, fine art, music, creative writing, dance, theatre, architecture, interior, education in art, interaction design
 Enschede has two locations: the AKI Academy for Art & Design offering graphic design, fine art, and moving image, and the conservatory, offering music and education in art
 Zwolle: graphic design, music, architecture, interior, education in art

Notable alumni

 Alexander van Slobbe (fashion designer)
 Iris van Herpen (fashion designer)
 Lucas Ossendrijver (fashion designer)
 Viktor & Rolf (fashion designers)
 Wilbert Das (fashion designer)
 Lidewij Edelkoort (trend forecaster)
 Marcel Wanders (product designer)
 Ruud-Jan Kokke (product designer)
 Martin Majoor (type designer)
 Tom Holkenborg (DJ, componist and producer)
 Daan Roosegaarde (innovator)
 Levi van Veluw (fine arts)

References

External links
 ArtEZ official website

Art schools in the Netherlands
Schools in Arnhem